Hershel Ray Martin (September 19, 1909 – November 17, 1980) was an American professional baseball player and scout. An outfielder born in Birmingham, Alabama, and raised in Ponca City, Oklahoma, Martin played for 23 seasons, mostly in minor league baseball, although he did appear in 607 Major League games in 1937–1940 and 1944–1945 for the Philadelphia Phillies and New York Yankees.

He had 643 hits during his Major League career, batting .285, including 28 home runs, 135 doubles and 29 triples. His 3 seasons with the Phillies occurred during one of the worst stretches in the team's history; from  through , the Phils compiled a record of 201–406 (.331). At age 34 he was acquired by the Yankees from the minor-league version of the Milwaukee Brewers and appeared in 202 games for the Bombers during the World War II manpower shortage.

In 1948, as the playing manager of the Class C Albuquerque Dukes of the West Texas–New Mexico League, Martin batted .425 with 61 doubles and 128 runs batted in. The following seasons, he hit .376 and .389. Overall as a minor leaguer he batted .317 with 2,298 hits.

After retiring from the field, Martin scouted for the Phillies (1955–1956), Chicago Cubs (1958) and New York Mets (1961–1979).

Hershel Martin was former MLB commissioner Bud Selig's favorite player as a youngster.

External links

1909 births
1980 deaths
Abilene Blue Sox players
Albuquerque Dukes players
Bartlesville Pirates players
Baseball players from Birmingham, Alabama
Baseball players from Oklahoma
Bloomington Bloomers players
Borger Gassers players
Chicago Cubs scouts
Des Moines Bruins players
Elmira Red Wings players
Houston Buffaloes players
Jackson Mississippians players
Jersey City Giants players
Major League Baseball outfielders
Monroe Twins players
New York Mets scouts
New York Yankees players
Oakland Oaks (baseball) players
People from Ponca City, Oklahoma
Philadelphia Phillies players
Philadelphia Phillies scouts
Pittsburg Pirates players
Pocatello Bannocks players
Springfield Cardinals players
Springfield Senators players
Tulsa Oilers (baseball) players
Vicksburg Hill Billies players